Parochodaeus is a genus of sand-loving scarab beetles in the family Ochodaeidae. There are more than 20 described species in Parochodaeus.

Species
These 21 species belong to the genus Parochodaeus:

 Parochodaeus biarmatus (LeConte, 1863)
 Parochodaeus bituberculatus (Erichson, 1847)
 Parochodaeus californicus (Horn, 1895)
 Parochodaeus campsognathus (Arrow, 1904)
 Parochodaeus cornutus (Ohaus, 1910)
 Parochodaeus dentipes Paulsen & Ocampo, 2012
 Parochodaeus duplex (LeConte, 1868)
 Parochodaeus howdeni (Carlson, 1975)
 Parochodaeus inarmatus (Schaeffer, 1906)
 Parochodaeus jujuyus Paulsen & Ocampo, 2012
 Parochodaeus pectoralis (LeConte, 1868)
 Parochodaeus peninsularis (Horn, 1895)
 Parochodaeus perdidus Paulsen, 2014
 Parochodaeus perplexus Paulsen & Ocampo, 2012
 Parochodaeus phoxus Paulsen & Ocampo, 2012
 Parochodaeus pixius (Paulsen, 2011) (pixie sand-loving scarab)
 Parochodaeus pocadioides (Motschulsky, 1859)
 Parochodaeus proceripes Paulsen & Ocampo, 2012
 Parochodaeus pudu Paulsen & Ocampo, 2012
 Parochodaeus ritcheri (Carlson, 1975)
 Parochodaeus stupendus Paulsen & Ocampo, 2012

References

Further reading

 
 

Scarabaeoidea genera
Articles created by Qbugbot